The Cherubini Quartet (German: Cherubini-Quartett) was a German string quartet from Düsseldorf, founded in 1978.

It is named after the Italian composer Luigi Cherubini, who wrote six string quartets. The Cherubini Quartet has won international acclaim with its interpretations of nineteenth-century string quartets, winning prizes such as the Grand Prix in Evian/France.

Members 

 Violin: Christoph Poppen
 Violin: Harald Schoneweg (1978–1994), Ulf Gunnar Wallin (1995–1997)
 Viola: Hariolf Schlichtig
 Violoncello: Klaus Kämper (1978–1989), Manuel Fischer-Dieskau (1989–1995), Christoph Richter (1995–1997)

Repertoire 

The Cherubini Quartet has performed string quartets by Wolfgang Amadeus Mozart, Franz Schubert, Felix Mendelssohn, and Robert Schumann.

Awards 
 Märkisches Stipendium für Musik for the years 1980/81 and 1981/82
 Grand Prix at the International String Quartet Competition in Evian/France in 1981

References

External links 
 
 Entry in the ACADEMIC Universal-Lexikon (in German)

German string quartets
Musical groups established in 1978
1978 establishments in Germany